Francisco José 'Paco' Borrego Campos (born 6 June 1986 in Jaén, Andalusia) is a Spanish footballer who plays for CD Rota as a central defender.

External links

1986 births
Living people
Spanish footballers
Footballers from Jaén, Spain
Association football defenders
Segunda División players
Segunda División B players
Tercera División players
FC Barcelona C players
Sevilla Atlético players
UD Barbastro players
SD Huesca footballers
Elche CF players
UD Salamanca players
San Fernando CD players
Mérida AD players
CD Badajoz players
Xerez CD footballers
UD Los Barrios footballers
Cypriot First Division players
Doxa Katokopias FC players
Spain youth international footballers
Spanish expatriate footballers
Expatriate footballers in Cyprus
Spanish expatriate sportspeople in Cyprus